Columbus Avenue may refer to:

 Columbus Avenue (Boston)
 Columbus Avenue (Manhattan)
 Columbus Avenue (San Francisco)
 Columbus Avenue Cable Line, M7 (New York City bus) 
 Columbus Avenue Historic District, in Sandusky, Ohio